Charles Freeman Gillette (1886–1969) was a prominent landscape architect in the upper South who specialized in the creation of grounds supporting Colonial Revival architecture, particularly in Richmond, Virginia.  He is associated with the restoration and re-creation of historic gardens in the upper South and especially Virginia.  He is known for having established a regional style—known as the "Virginia Garden."

Biography

In 1909-1911, Gillette served as an apprentice in the office of Warren H. Manning, a leading early-20th century landscape architect. Gillette moved to Richmond in 1913 to supervise the completion of Manning's landscape design for the University of Richmond's new campus. In 1915, he began designing the grounds of the Nelson House in Yorktown, Virginia. In 1924, he commenced work on the landscape restoration of Kenmore in Fredericksburg, Virginia. A few years later, he initiated plans for the landscaping of Virginia House and Agecroft, both reconstructed English manor houses located in Richmond's Windsor Farms neighborhood. Extensive additions to the Virginia House gardens were completed in 1939. During the 1950s, Gillette redesigned the gardens of Virginia's Executive Mansion at the request of Governor Thomas B. Stanley.  In 1958, he designed the grounds for the Reynolds Metals Company International Headquarters located at Richmond. His commissions also included hundreds of residential projects throughout Virginia and North Carolina.

A number of his works are for properties listed on the National Register of Historic Places.

In popular culture
Author Tom Wolfe references Gillette as the commissioned landscaper of Dupont University in I Am Charlotte Simmons.

Selected works
 University of Richmond (1913), Richmond, VA
 Nelson House (1915), Yorktown, Virginia
 Casa Maria (1921-1922), Greenwood, VA
 Blue Ridge Farm (1923-1924), Greenwood, VA
 Sunken Garden (Virginia) (1923-1924), Williamsburg, Virginia
 Kenmore (1924), Fredericksburg, Virginia
 Agecroft Hall (1926), Richmond, VA
 MacCallum More and Hudgins House Historic District gardens (1927), Chase City, Virginia
 Belfield (1929-1930), Lexington, Virginia
 Gallison Hall (1931-1933), Charlottesville, VA
 Windemere (1860), Richmond, VA
 Midway (Millington, Virginia) (1936), Millington, VA
 Reynolds Metals Company International Headquarters (1958), Richmond, VA
 Lewis Ginter Botanical Garden, Richmond, VA
 Glen Alpine in the Cifax Rural Historic District, Cifax, Virginia
 Oak Grove (Eastville, Virginia), Eastville, VA
 E. Hervey Evans House (1939), Laurinburg, NC
 Monroe Ward, Richmond, VA
 John Whitworth House, Richmond, VA
 Longview Gardens Historic District
 Meadowbrook Country Club (Chesterfield County, Virginia)

References

External links
 The Cultural Landscape Foundation: Charles Freeman Gillette
Garden and Gun: "Gillette's Gem"

American landscape architects
Architects from Richmond, Virginia
1886 births
1969 deaths
Preservationist architects
People from Chippewa Falls, Wisconsin
20th-century American architects
Architects from Wisconsin